Newport Festival may refer to a number of events in the United States:

Rhode Island
 Newport Jazz Festival (begun 1954), a music festival held every August
 Newport Folk Festival (begun 1959), an American annual folk-oriented music festival
 Newport Music Festival (begun 1969), a classical music festival
 Newport International Film Festival (begun 1998), a film festival held in Newport, Rhode Island

California
Newport Pop Festival, held in Costa Mesa, California, in 1968, or sequel, billed as Newport 69, held in Northridge, California in 1969
Newport Beach Film Festival (begun 1999), a film festival held in Newport Beach, California

See also
 Isle of Wight Festival, near Newport, England
 At Newport (disambiguation) for music albums recorded at these festivals
 Festivals in Rhode Island